Aftermath is a 2021 American horror film directed by Peter Winther, starring Ashley Greene and Shawn Ashmore. It was released on August 4 on Netflix.

Plot
A young couple struggling to stay together are offered an amazing deal on a home with a questionable past that would normally be beyond their means. In a final attempt to start fresh as a couple, they take the deal.

Cast
 Ashley Greene as Natalie Dadich
 Shawn Ashmore as Kevin Dadich
 Sharif Atkins as Officer Richardson
 Jason Liles as Otto
 Britt Baron as Dani
 Diana Hopper as Avery
 Jamie Kaler as Dave
 Travis Coles as Garrett 
 Susan Walters as Farrah
 Ross McCall as Nick Scott
 Paula Garcés as Claudia
 Sandra Prosper as Anne Levin
 Juliette Jeffers as Dr. Sasner

References

External links
 
 

2021 films
2021 thriller films
2020s English-language films
American thriller films
2020s American films